Matilde Elena López (20 February 1919 – 11 March 2010) was a Salvadoran poet, essayist, playwright and literary critic.  Her most important works include “Masferrer, alto pensador de Centro América”, “Cartas a Grosa” and “La balada de Anastasio Aquino”.

During the 1940s she was part of the League of Anti-Fascist Writers, a group of young writers with leftist ideas. In April 1944, she participated in the popular movement that sought to overthrow the government of dictator Maximiliano Hernández Martínez. She studied at the University of San Carlos de Guatemala and the Universidad Central del Ecuador, and at from latter University she received a doctorate degree in philosophy.

In 1958 she joined the University of El Salvador where she worked as professor, director of the Department of Arts and Vice Dean of the Faculty of Humanities. She has also taught at the Universidad Centroamericana "Jose Simeon Cañas". Her 1978 play, The Ballad of Anastasio Aquino is dedicated to the Salvadoran indigenous leader Anastasio Aquino.

From 1997 until her death she was a member of the Academia Salvadoreña de la Lengua.

Notable works
 Masferrer, alto pensador de Centroamérica (essay, 1954), 
 Interpretación social del arte (essay, 1965), 
 Dante, poeta y ciudadano del futuro (essay, 1965), 
 Estudio-prólogo a las Obras escogidas de Alberto Masferrer (1971), 
 Estudio-prólogo a las Obras escogidas de Claudia Lars (1973), 
 Estudios sobre poesía (essay, 1973), 
 La balada de Anastasio Aquino (play, 1978), 
 Los sollozos oscuros (poetry, 1982), 
 El verbo amar (poetry, 1997)  
 Ensayos literarios (1998).

References

External links
Biography and selected poetry
League of Anti-Fascist Writers

1919 births
2010 deaths
Salvadoran women writers
Salvadoran poets
Women poets
Salvadoran dramatists and playwrights
Salvadoran essayists
People from San Salvador
Universidad de San Carlos de Guatemala alumni
Salvadoran women poets
Women dramatists and playwrights
Salvadoran women essayists
20th-century women writers
20th-century poets
20th-century dramatists and playwrights
20th-century essayists
Salvadoran expatriates in Guatemala
Expatriates in Ecuador
20th-century Salvadoran women writers